Ribes wolfii is a North American species of currant known by the common names Wolf's currant and Rothrock currant. It is native to the western United States. The distribution is disjunct or discontinuous, with two distinct concentrations of populations separate by a gap of over 320 km (200 miles). One is in northern Idaho, northeastern Oregon, and southeastern Washington. The other is in Utah, Colorado, Arizona, and New Mexico. There is also a report of an isolated population south of the border in Chihuahua, Mexico.

Ribes wolfii is a shrub up to 5 meters (almost 17 feet) tall, with cream-colored, pinkish or green pink flowers. Berries are black, glandular, and reportedly sweet and tasty.

References

wolfii
Plants described in 1893
Flora of Chihuahua (state)
Flora of the Western United States
Flora without expected TNC conservation status